Martin Birmann (26 November 1828 – 19 August 1890) was a Swiss politician and President of the Swiss Council of States (1884).

External links 
 
 
 

1828 births
1890 deaths
People from Basel-Landschaft
Swiss Calvinist and Reformed ministers
Members of the Council of States (Switzerland)
Presidents of the Council of States (Switzerland)